The Israeli Adjutant Corps is a support corps in the IDF Human Resources Directorate. Its current commander is Brigadier General Shlomi Sandrosi.

The corps's designation is to assist IDF commanders in dealing with manpower, as well as soldiers' individual problems. It employs an adjutant officer (as well as assistants) in almost every unit, as well as a liaison officer in reserve units, who is responsible for the manpower aspect of the unit, as well as attending to the reservists' individual needs.

History
The corps was created on May 22, 1977, as one of three corps established as a conclusion to drawing lesson from the IDF's shortcomings in the Yom Kippur War. During the war, the hasty manner in which reserve troops were called to service as well as the reconstitution of fighting units, especially critically needed tank crews, posed special problems for the Manpower Directorate, ones which the corps is designed to address.

The idea to create an adjutant corps was raised before the Yom Kippur War, but was not implemented. After the war, the necessity of the corps was understood and the Chief of Staff of the time, Mordechai Gur, in a meeting with senior officers from the Manpower Directorate (now Human Resources Directorate), decided on its creation.

The Adjutant Corps transferred from the Human Resources Directorate to the GOC Army Headquarters during the course of 2006, and the official responsibility for the corps passed to the command on January 1 of that year. However, after a while it was decided to transfer it back to the Human Resources Directorate, and it was moved in June 2008.

Training
Adjutant Corps personnel are trained in Training Base 11 located in the City of Training Bases.

Commanders

References

Corps of Israel
Military units and formations established in 1977